Sandrine Tas (born 7 September 1995) is a Belgian inline skater and speed skater.

Personal records

She is currently in 147th position in the adelskalender with a points total of 158.736.

Tournament summary

Source:

References

External links
 Sandrine Tas at ISUresults.eu
 
 
 
 
 

1995 births
Living people
Belgian female speed skaters
Olympic speed skaters of Belgium
Speed skaters at the 2022 Winter Olympics
Competitors at the 2017 World Games
World Games gold medalists
World Games silver medalists
World Games bronze medalists
21st-century Belgian women